Avali Javali is a 1981 Indian Kannada-language film, directed by A. V. Sheshagiri Rao and produced by P. Krishnaraj. The film stars Srinath, Lokesh, Chandrashekar and Lokanath. The film has musical score by Chellapilla Satyam.

Cast

 Srinath
 Lokesh
 Chandrashekar
 Lokanath
 Manjula
 Hema Choudhary
 Ashalatha
 Musuri Krishnamurthy
 Manu
 Sudheer
 Chethan Ramarao
 A. S. Murthy
 P. Krishnaraj in Guest Appearance
 N. Devaraj in Guest Appearance
 Master Murali in Guest Appearance
 Master Mohan in Guest Appearance
 Rekha Rao in Guest Appearance
 Uma Shivakumar
 Ramadevi
 Lalithamma
 Comedian Guggu

Soundtrack
The music was composed by Satyam.

References

External links
 

1980s Kannada-language films
Films scored by Satyam (composer)
Films directed by A. V. Seshagiri Rao